Darragh McCullough (born 1977) is an Irish journalist, broadcaster and farmer specialising in agricultural and rural affairs. He has worked for RTÉ, the Irish Farmers Journal, and Independent News and Media. He is the longest serving presenter on RTÉ television's Ear to the Ground programme, and the deputy editor of the Irish Independent newspaper's Farming supplement.

Early life 
McCullough grew up on the family farm in County Meath. He went to the Franciscan Gormanston College, before attending Greenmount Agricultural College and University College Dublin (UCD), where he received an honours degree in Agricultural Science. He also has a Masters in International Development from UCD.

Career 

After graduating in 1999, McCullough worked on RTÉ Radio 1's farming news programmes, before moving in 2001 to television to present the farming, food and rural affairs programme, Ear to the Ground. At the same time he started working with the Irish Farmers Journal, where he wrote a weekly column, Darragh's Diary. In 2010 he switched to the Irish Independent newspaper's farming section. In 2014, he shared the best television award from the International Federation of Agricultural Journalists with his producer, Paula Williams for their Ear to the Ground story on Limerick farmer, Seamus Sherlock's battle to save his farm from repossession by the banks.

Farm 

McCullough's farm features regularly on Ear to the Ground. It is a mixed farm that focuses on flower production. In 2015, his family entered a dairy partnership with their neighbours.

Social activities 

Darragh is keen into sports and exercise away from television and his farm. He often plays badminton for his local club Julianstown in the Meath leagues and also represented Meath in intercounty competition.

References

Living people
Irish journalists
1977 births
Alumni of University College Dublin